{{Infobox person
| name         = Rubby Opio Aweri
| image        =
| image_size   =
| caption      =
| birth_date   = 
| birth_place  = Dokolo District, Protectorate of Uganda
| death_date   = 
| death_place  = Mulago, Kampala, Uganda
| alma_mater   = Makerere University (Bachelor of Laws)(Master of Laws)Law Development Centre( Diploma in Legal Practice)| occupation   = Lawyer, judge
| years_active = 1982—2022 (his death)
| nationality  = Ugandan
| citizenship  = Uganda
| known_for    = Law
| title        = Justice of the Supreme Court of Uganda
| spouse       = 
}} Rubby Opio Aweri, also Rubby Aweri Opio''' (31 May 1953 – 7 December 2022) was a Ugandan lawyer and judge, who served as a justice of the Supreme Court of Uganda, from September 2015. In August 2017, the Judiciary named him as  the new Chief Inspector of Courts on a three-year term.

Background and education
Aweri was born in Dokolo District in 1953, the son of the late Samwiri Opio Aweri.

Aweri held a Bachelor of Laws from Makerere University, in Kampala. He held a Diploma in Legal Practice from the Law Development Centre, also in Kampala. His Master of Laws was also obtained from Makerere University.

Career
Aweri's career started in 1982, as a legal assistant in the Soroti District. In 1983, Aweri was appointed a grade one magistrate. He gradually rose through the ranks and in 1998, was appointed a judge of the High Court. In 2014, he was promoted to the Uganda Court of Appeal. In September 2015, he was elevated to the Supreme Court of Uganda. In August 2017, the Judiciary named him as  the new Chief Inspector of Courts on a three-year term.

Personal life and death
Aweri was married. He died at Mulago National Referral Hospital on 7 December 2022, at the age of 69.

References

1953 births
2022 deaths
20th-century Ugandan judges
21st-century Ugandan judges
Justices of the Supreme Court of Uganda
Law Development Centre alumni
Academic staff of Makerere University
People from Dokolo District
People from Northern Region, Uganda